A Bachelor of General Studies or a Bachelor in General Studies (BGS) is a highly interdisciplinary undergraduate academic degree offered by colleges and universities that "allows students to combine and explore multiple subjects." 

The concept of general studies derives from the medieval European university concept of studium generale. A BGS program allows students to design a degree plan with advisors while meeting their academic institution's general requirements. Students can typically choose from concentrations in a variety of areas.

Despite its name, Columbia University School of General Studies does not confer Bachelor of General Studies degrees but Bachelor of Arts degrees instead.

See also
General Studies
Liberal arts education (Bachelor of Liberal Arts)

References

General Studies, Bachelor